Boring machine may refer to:

 Boring machine (carpentry)
 A machine for boring (manufacturing) holes
 Tunnel boring machine

See also
 Boring (disambiguation)